High Street Kensington is a London Underground station on Kensington High Street, in Kensington. The station is on the Circle line between Gloucester Road and Notting Hill Gate, and the District line between Earl's Court and Notting Hill Gate and is in Travelcard Zone 1. Kensington Arcade forms the entrance to the station.

Services
The station itself has four platforms─two through platforms and two bay platforms. Platform 1 is used for anticlockwise Circle line and westbound District line trains towards Gloucester Road and Earl's Court respectively. Platform 2 is for clockwise Circle line and eastbound District line trains towards Edgware Road. Platforms 3 and 4 are used for terminating District line trains from Earl's Court.  Platform 3 is usually used for the Olympia service, which runs weekends and for special events, and platform 4 is usually only used at the start and end of the day. There used to be a waiting room between Platform 2 and 3 for customer use, but this was turned into a staff room for drivers shortly before the Circle line extension to Hammersmith was implemented in December 2009.

Just south of the station is the junction where the Circle and District lines diverge.

The typical off-peak service from this station is:
 12 tph (trains per hour) to Edgware Road via Paddington (6 tph District line, 6 tph Circle line)
 6 tph to Wimbledon via Earl's Court (District line)
 6 tph anticlockwise on the Circle line via Victoria and Embankment to Hammersmith
Weekend and Special Events only:

 3 tph to Kensington (Olympia) via Earl's Court (District line)

Connections
London Buses routes 9, 23, 27, 28, 49, 52, 70, 328, 452 and C1, night routes N9, N27, N28 and N31 and Green Line route 702 serve the station.

Gallery

See also
 Cromwell Curve

References

Circle line (London Underground) stations
District line stations
Tube stations in the Royal Borough of Kensington and Chelsea
Former Metropolitan Railway stations
Railway stations in Great Britain opened in 1868
Former Metropolitan District Railway stations
Railway stations in Great Britain opened in 1871
Kensington